Saddle Legion is a 1951 American Western film directed by Lesley Selander and starring Tim Holt. It co-stars Dorothy Malone, who was one of Holt's most prestigious co-stars.  She was borrowed from Warner Bros.

Plot
In the Old West, Dave Saunders and sidekick, Chito Rafferty, are looking for jobs as cowhands with rancher Fred Warren. Warren's cowhand, Gabe, drunkenly causes a stampede, and shoots Warren, injuring him. Gabe rides away, but Dave captures him. Chito escorts Dr. Ann Rollins to Warren's ranch for treatment of Warren's wounds. Chito is attracted to Dr. Rollins. Gabe, being held captive at the Warren ranch, escapes over the Mexican border.

In Mexico, Gabe meets with bar owner Ace Kelso who hires him to rustle Warren's cattle. Kelso's gang ambush and kill Graham, the cattle inspector. Kelso's henchman, Regan, steals Graham's credentials in order to pose as Graham. Chito discovers Gabe around Warren's herd suspiciously tending to a calf, and confronts him. Gabe knocks Chito down and escapes. Regan, posing as Graham, inspects the herd and determines a calf (the same one Chito saw with Gabe) shows evidence of blackleg disease and says Warren's entire herd must be condemned and destroyed. Dave becomes suspicious and orders the inspectors held until Chito can bring Warren back. Warren returns with Chito and two other local ranchers. The ranchers confirm the calf has blackleg.

Anticipating destruction of his herd, Warren lays off Dave and Chito, who return to Dr. Rollins asking if she knows anything about blackleg. Dr. Rollins researches the disease and tells them it could also be dangerous to humans. Returning to Warren's ranch to warn him, Dave and Chito see Gabe and Regan together with the injured calf. Dave becomes suspicious and he and Chito follow Gabe to Kelso's bar. Kelso picks a fight with Dave and Chito in order to have the Mexican police arrest them. Dave and Chito escape back across the border. Dave suspects Kelso and "Inspector Graham" as being in cahoots to rustle Warren's cattle. Dr. Rollins goes to the chief cattle inspector, John Layton, for help. Dave and Chito arrive and advise Layton of Kelso. Layton suspects an imposter is posing as Graham.  Dave and Chito locate Regan (as Graham) with Layton's written order not to move the herd. Regan rides across the border to warn Kelso. Dave and Chito follow him to Kelso's bar, and overhear Kelso's plan to rustle Warren's cattle across the border. Chito rides for help while Dave follows Kelso's gang.  Dave surprises Gabe and Hooker, one of Kelso's henchman. Dave kills Hooker who draws on him. Dave holds Gabe hostage when Kelso's gang arrives, but they kill Gabe, leaving Dave undefended. A gunfight ensues between Dave and rest of the gang. Chito returns with Warren and the other ranchers. Dave runs out of ammunition just as Chito arrives with help and subdues the gang. Dave and Chito leave to take the cattle to market. Chito, who usually runs away from romantic commitments, asks Dr. Rollins to wait for him until his return.

Cast

Notes
According to film scholar Tom Stempel, Malone was "the most interesting actress" to appear in a Tim Holt Western:
The other women in the B westerns tended to be cute rather than sexy, but Malone's look and voice were sex personified. So when Chito flirts with her Ann, Malone is way beyond that kind of B western cuteness ... Malone's sexual presence upsets the usual dynamics of the B westerns, and the filmmakers may have realized that Malone's Ann would have eaten Martin's Chito alive ... [In the final scene] As he and Tim leave to take the cattle to market, Chito says to Ann, "You make sure you wait until I come back." Since the end of the Holt westerns usually involved Chito running or riding away from girl who wants to marry him, the ending of Saddle Legion is a little more adult.

References

External links
 
 
 
 

1951 films
1951 Western (genre) films
American Western (genre) films
RKO Pictures films
Films scored by Paul Sawtell
American black-and-white films
1950s English-language films
Films directed by Lesley Selander
1950s American films